The 1997 standoff at Roby, Illinois, sometimes referred to as Roby Ridge and the Standoff at Roby Ridge, is one of the longest single person standoffs in history. With the involved party being an elderly woman named Shirley Allen, of Roby, Illinois, a former nurse whose family's 1997 attempt to have her involuntarily committed led to a 39-day standoff with Illinois State Police and other law-enforcement agencies.

On September 22, 1997, officers of the Christian County, Illinois sheriff's department attempted to serve commitment papers that had been questionably obtained by a court order after a petition by some of her relatives.  Though the relatives have said they were concerned about her mental state, many, such as her best friend Marie E. Gribbins (Riech), have alleged that the motive was to gain control of her land; there were two oil wells on her 47-acre (190,000 m2) farm. Illinois State Police Director Terry Gainer said at the time that police were "there for this woman's protection and for the protection of her neighbors. I think we're doing the right thing. We can't afford not to."

The police were accused by bystanders of using military tactics against Allen after she allegedly fired a shotgun in the air.  Witnesses differ as to who fired first, and indeed, police have offered contradictory statements on this.

The police also used tear gas against Allen.  She defended herself by crafting a makeshift gas mask using a rag and Vaseline, and lay on the floor to avoid the gas., She also used makeshift armor made out of pillows and magazines to defend herself against rubber bullets. Police also played music at high volume, used a police dog to attempt to take her into custody, and eventually shut off her electricity, gas and water.  They arrested a neighbor who tried to bring her food and water. Other neighbors paid Allen's bills and attempted to provide her with food. Numerous protestors stayed at the site during the standoff, including members of the militia movement such as the Midwest Patriot Militia of Illinois.

Aftermath
After six weeks in a mental hospital, Allen was released when doctors said she posed no danger to herself or others.

The standoff drew international attention, and controversies over the cost of the operation as well as involuntary commitment laws ensued. Local authorities spent almost $1 million in relation to the event.  Self-described "patriot" and militia groups, as well as the Libertarian Party, called for reform of Illinois mental health laws that provide for the hospitalization of people who do not break the law.  There have also been accusations that the police violated her First Amendment rights. Some have dubbed the incident Roby Ridge, an allusion to the 1992 Ruby Ridge standoff.

In popular culture
Dave von Kleist recorded a song about the standoff, "The Ballad of Shirley Allen".

Notes

References

Further reading

External links
 "The Greatest Showdown On Earth". Weekly Wire.
 http://www.parascope.com/articles/1097/robyridge.htm
 https://web.archive.org/web/20110810212744/http://67.151.102.46/story/?id=39536
 Shirley Allen at Neohumanism site

Year of birth missing (living people)
Place of birth missing (living people)
Conflicts in 1997
Law enforcement in Illinois